Lloyd Clifton Bishop (April 25, 1890 – June 18, 1968) was a Major League Baseball pitcher who played for one season. He played for the Cleveland Naps from September 5, 1914, to September 14, 1914. Bishop attended Wichita State.

References

External links

1890 births
1968 deaths
Cleveland Naps players
Wichita State Shockers baseball players
Major League Baseball pitchers
Baseball players from Kansas
People from Sumner County, Kansas